Below is the list of populated places in Bingöl Province, Turkey by the districts. First name in each district is the capital of the ilçe (district).

Bingöl
 Bingöl
 Ağaçeli, Bingöl
 Ağaçyolu, Bingöl
 Akdurmuş, Bingöl
 Alatepe, Bingöl
 Alibir, Bingöl
 Alıncık, Bingöl
 Altınışık, Bingöl
 Ardıçtepe, Bingöl
 Arıcılar, Bingöl
 Aşağıakpınar, Bingöl
 Aşağıköy, Bingöl
 Bahçeli, Bingöl
 Balıklıçay, Bingöl
 Balpınar, Bingöl
 Bilaloğlu, Bingöl
 Büyüktekören, Bingöl
 Çavuşlar, Bingöl
 Çayağzı, Bingöl
 Çayboyu, Bingöl
 Çeltiksuyu, Bingöl
 Çevrimpınar, Bingöl
 Çiçekdere, Bingöl
 Çiçekyayla, Bingöl
 Çiriş Köyü, Bingöl
 Çobantaşı, Bingöl
 Çukurca, Bingöl
 Dallıtepe, Bingöl
 Dikköy, Bingöl
 Dikme, Bingöl
 Direkli, Bingöl
 Dişbudak, Bingöl
 Düzyayla, Bingöl
 Ekinyolu, Bingöl
 Elmalı, Bingöl
 Erdemli, Bingöl
 Erentepe, Bingöl
 Garip, Bingöl
 Gökçekanat, Bingöl
 Gökçeli, Bingöl
 Gökdere, Bingöl
 Göltepesi, Bingöl
 Gözeler, Bingöl
 Gözer, Bingöl
 Gümüşlü, Bingöl
 Güngören, Bingöl
 Gürpınar, Bingöl
 Güveçli, Bingöl
 Haziran, Bingöl
 Ilıcalar, Bingöl
 İncesu, Bingöl
 Kardeşler, Bingöl
 Kartal, Bingöl
 Kılçadır, Bingöl
 Kıran, Bingöl
 Kırkağıl, Bingöl
 Köklü, Bingöl
 Küçüktekören, Bingöl
 Kumgeçit, Bingöl
 Kurtuluş, Bingöl
 Kuruca, Bingöl
 Kurudere, Bingöl
 Kuşburnu, Bingöl
 Kuşkondu, Bingöl
 Oğuldere, Bingöl
 Olukpınar, Bingöl
 Ormanardı, Bingöl
 Ortaçanak, Bingöl
 Ortaköy, Bingöl
 Sancak, Bingöl
 Sancaklı, Bingöl
 Sarıçiçek, Bingöl
 Sudüğünü, Bingöl
 Sütgölü, Bingöl
 Suvaran, Bingöl
 Şabanköy , Bingöl
 Tepebaşı, Bingöl
 Topalan, Bingöl
 Uğurova, Bingöl
 Uzunsavat, Bingöl
 Üçyaka, Bingöl
 Yamaç, Bingöl
 Yaygınçayır, Bingöl
 Yazgülü, Bingöl
 Yelesen, Bingöl
 Yenibaşlar, Bingöl
 Yeniköy, Bingöl
 Yeşilköy, Bingöl
 Yolçatı, Bingöl
 Yukarıakpınar, Bingöl
 Yumaklı, Bingöl

Adaklı
 Adaklı
 Akbinek, Adaklı
 Aktaş , Adaklı
 Altınevler , Adaklı
 Aysaklı , Adaklı
 Ayvadüzü, Adaklı
 Bağlarpınarı, Adaklı
 Boyalı, Adaklı
 Cevizli, Adaklı
 Çamlıca, Adaklı
 Çatma , Adaklı
 Çevreli , Adaklı
 Doğankaya , Adaklı
 Doluçay , Adaklı
 Dolutekne , Adaklı
 Elmaağaç , Adaklı
 Elmadüzü , Adaklı
 Erbaşlar, Adaklı
 Erler , Adaklı
 Gökçeli , Adaklı
 Hasbağlar, Adaklı
 Kabaçalı , Adaklı
 Kamışgölü Köyü, Adaklı
 Karaçubuk , Adaklı
 Kaynakdüzü, Adaklı
 Kırkpınar , Adaklı
 Kozlu , Adaklı
 Mercan, Adaklı
 Sarıdibek , Adaklı
 Sevkar, Adaklı
 Sütlüce, Adaklı
 Topağaçlar, Adaklı
 Yeldeğirmeni , Adaklı

Genç
 Genç
 Alaaddin , Genç
 Ardıçdibi , Genç
 Balgöze, Genç
 Bayırlı, Genç
 Binekli , Genç
 Bulgurluk, Genç
 Büyükçağ , Genç
 Çamlıyurt , Genç
 Çanakçı, Genç
 Çaybaşı , Genç
 Çaytepe, Genç
 Çevirme, Genç
 Çobançeşmesi, Genç
 Dedebağı, Genç
 Dereköy, Genç
 Dikpınar, Genç
 Dilektaşı , Genç
 Direkli, Genç
 Doğanca, Genç
 Doğanevler, Genç
 Doğanlı, Genç
 Döşekkaya, Genç
 Elmagünü, Genç
 Ericek, Genç
 Eskibağ, Genç
 Gerçekli, Genç
 Geyikdere, Genç
 Gönülaçan, Genç
 Gözertepe, Genç
 Gözütok, Genç
 Günkondu, Genç
 Güzeldere, Genç
 Harmancık, Genç
 Karcı, Genç
 Kavaklı, Genç
 Keklikdere, Genç
 Kepçeli, Genç
 Koçsırtı, Genç
 Meşedalı, Genç
 Mollaibrahim, Genç
 Pınaraltı, Genç
 Sağgöze, Genç
 Sarıbudak, Genç
 Sarısaman, Genç
 Sarmakaya, Genç
 Servi, Genç
 Sırmalıoya, Genç
 Soğukpınar, Genç
 Sürekli, Genç
 Şehitköy, Genç
 Şehittepe, Genç
 Tarlabaşı, Genç
 Üçgül, Genç
 Yağızca, Genç
 Yatansöğüt, Genç
 Yaydere, Genç
 Yayla, Genç
 Yazılı, Genç
 Yazkonağı, Genç
 Yelkaya, Genç
 Yenisu, Genç
 Yeniyazı, Genç
 Yiğitbaşı, Genç
 Yolaçtı, Genç

Karlıova
 Karlıova
 Aşağıyağmurlu , Karlıova
 Bağlıisa , Karlıova
 Bahçeköy , Karlıova
 Boncukgöze , Karlıova
 Cilligöl , Karlıova
 Çatak , Karlıova
 Çiftlikköy , Karlıova
 Çukurtepe, Karlıova
 Derinçay, Karlıova
 Devecik , Karlıova
 Dörtyol , Karlıova
 Geçitli, Karlıova
 Göynük , Karlıova
 Hacılar , Karlıova
 Harmantepe , Karlıova
 Hasanova, Karlıova
 Ilıpınar, Karlıova
 Kalencik , Karlıova
 Kantarkaya , Karlıova
 Karabalçık , Karlıova
 Kargapazarı , Karlıova
 Karlıca , Karlıova
 Kaşıkçı, Karlıova
 Kaynak, Karlıova
 Kaynarpınar , Karlıova
 Kazanlı, Karlıova
 Kıraçtepe, Karlıova
 Kızılağaç , Karlıova
 Kızılçubuk , Karlıova
 Kümbet, Karlıova
 Mollaşakir , Karlıova
 Ortaköy , Karlıova
 Sakaören , Karlıova
 Sarıkuşak , Karlıova
 Serpmekaya, Karlıova
 Soğukpınar , Karlıova
 Suçatı , Karlıova
 Sudurağı, Karlıova
 Taşlıçay, Karlıova
 Toklular, Karlıova
 Tuzluca, Karlıova
 Viranşehir , Karlıova
 Yeniköy , Karlıova
 Yiğitler , Karlıova
 Yoncalık , Karlıova
 Yorgançayır , Karlıova
 Yukarıyağmurlu , Karlıova

Kiğı
 Kiğı
 Açıkgüney, Kiğı
 Ağaçöven, Kiğı
 Alagöz, Kiğı
 Baklalı, Kiğı
 Billice, Kiğı
 Çanakçı, Kiğı
 Çiçektepe, Kiğı
 Dallıca, Kiğı
 Darköprü, Kiğı
 Demirdöş, Kiğı
 Demirkanat, Kiğı
 Duranlar, Kiğı
 Eskikavak, Kiğı
 Eşme, Kiğı
 Güneyağıl, Kiğı
 İlbeyi, Kiğı
 Kadıköy, Kiğı
 Kuşçimeni, Kiğı
 Kutluca, Kiğı
 Nacaklı, Kiğı
 Sabırtaşı, Kiğı
 Sırmaçek, Kiğı
 Yazgünü, Kiğı
 Yukarıserinyer, Kiğı

Solhan
 Solhan
 Arakonak, Solhan
 Arslanbeyli, Solhan
 Asmakaya, Solhan
 Bozkanat, Solhan
 Demirkapı, Solhan
 Dilektepe, Solhan
 Doğuyeli, Solhan
 Düzağaç, Solhan
 Elbaşı, Solhan
 Elmasırtı, Solhan
 Eşmetaş, Solhan
 Gelintepe, Solhan
 Gençtavus, Solhan
 Göksu, Solhan
 Hazarşah, Solhan
 İnandık, Solhan
 Kale, Solhan
 Kırık, Solhan
 Murat, Solhan
 Mutluca, Solhan
 Oymapınar, Solhan
 Sükyan, Solhan
 Sülünkaş, Solhan
 Şimşirpınar, Solhan
 Tarhan, Solhan
 Yenibaşak, Solhan
 Yenidal, Solhan
 Yiğitharman, Solhan

Yayladere
 Yayladere
 Alınyazı, Yayladere
 Aydınlar, Yayladere
 Batıayaz, Yayladere
 Bilekkaya, Yayladere
 Çalıkağıl, Yayladere
 Çatalkaya, Yayladere
 Çayağzı, Yayladere
 Dalbasan, Yayladere
 Doğucak, Yayladere
 Gökçedal, Yayladere
 Güneşlik, Yayladere
 Günlük, Yayladere
 Kalkanlı, Yayladere
 Korlu, Yayladere
 Sürmelikoç, Yayladere
 Yavuztaş, Yayladere
 Yaylabağ, Yayladere
 Zeynelli, Yayladere

Yedisu
 Yedisu
Ayanoğlu, Yedisu
Dinarbey, Yedisu
Elmalı, Yedisu
Eskibalta, Yedisu
Gelinpertek, Yedisu
Güzgülü, Yedisu
Kabayel, Yedisu
Karapolat, Yedisu
Kaşıklı, Yedisu
Şenköy, Yedisu
Yağmurpınar, Yedisu
Yeşilgöl, Yedisu

References

List
Bingöl